José Fernando Morales Rivera (born August 19, 1984), known as Kendo Kaponi, is a Puerto Rican rapper and singer.

In 2018, he was arrested in Coamo on charges of armed burglary and assault in Florida, where he subsequently served two years in prison.

Personal life 
Kaponi's life was tragic in many ways. With no family to care for him, he had begun to live in foster homes from when he was seven years old. His parents were drug addicts. He discovered his father's identity at same father's funeral. His mother was a heroin addict. Kaponi was raised by his grandmother until she died of cancer and was then put into foster care because no one in his family wanted to take up his care. In prison from the age of 13, he attempted suicide at the age of 16. When he was released from prison, he did live with his rehabilitated mother, but only for six months because she died of AIDS. He has two daughters. Later in life, he spent two years in a Florida prison for aggravated assault and Kaponi stated that protecting his family was the reason for assaulting the man.

Career 
Kaponi has released one mixtape, El Alpha & El Omega in 2018. He is also known for participating in productions with Don Omar such as Don Omar Presents: Meet the Orphans, which include El Duro, Viviendo Con el Enemigo, and RX. He was also involved in a diss battle against Baby Rasta, Cosculluela and Arcángel.

In 2020 Kendo Kaponi is released from prison, signs for the record label Real Hasta la Muerte and releases his song "Resistencia". In 2020 Kaponi collaborated with Daddy Yankee and Anuel AA on Don Don.

Legal issues 
Kaponi's first arrest came at the age of 13, on a drug charge, gun law violation, attempted murder, and liberty restriction. He was released when he was 19.

In 2014, Kaponi was arrested for domestic violence, and made a bail. In 2016, he was detained because his car was not up-to-date with its transfer process, and in January 2017, Kaponi was detained for contempt on an alimony order.

Kaponi was arrested by federal agents in 2018 on charges of armed burglary and assault. He was arrested on PR-143 in the barrio of Hayales in Coamo, Puerto Rico, and extradited to Florida. He was charged with attacking barber, Jon Erik Baez-Molano, at the Custom Kuts establishment in Winter Haven, Florida on July 28, 2017, with a metal pipe and a piece of wood. He and another person took the barber's wallet. After two years in prison, Kendo was released and interviewed by Primer Impacto, where he said he had beat the man because the man had hurt his son and not to rob him.

Discography

Studio albums 
 Apocalypto (TBA)

Mixtape 
 Musicologo & Menes: Kendo Edition (2016)
 El Alpha & El Omega (2018)

Filmography

References

External links 
 José Fernando Rivera Morales mugshot

1984 births
Living people
People from Bayamón, Puerto Rico
Puerto Rican rappers
Puerto Rican reggaeton musicians